The Mission District (Spanish: Distrito de la Misión), commonly known as The Mission (Spanish: La Misión), is a neighborhood in San Francisco, California. One of the oldest neighborhoods in San Francisco, the Mission District's name is derived from Mission San Francisco de Asís, built in 1776 by the Spanish. The Mission is historically one of the most notable center of the city's Chicano/Mexican-American community.

Location and climate

The Mission District is located in east-central San Francisco. It is bordered to the east by U.S. Route 101, which forms the boundary between the eastern portion of the district, known as "Inner Mission", and its eastern neighbor, Potrero Hill. Sanchez Street separates the neighborhood from Eureka Valley (containing the sub-district known as "the Castro") to the north west and Noe Valley to the south west. The part of the neighborhood from Valencia Street to Sanchez Street, north of 20th Street, is known as the "Mission Dolores" neighborhood. South of 20th Street towards 22nd Street, and between Valencia and Dolores Streets is a distinct neighborhood known as Liberty Hill. Cesar Chavez Street (formerly Army Street) is the southern border; across Cesar Chavez Street is the Bernal Heights neighborhood. North of the Mission District is the South of Market neighborhood, bordered roughly by Duboce Avenue and the elevated highway of the Central Freeway which runs above 13th Street.

The principal thoroughfare of the Mission District is Mission Street. South of the Mission District, along Mission Street, are the Excelsior and Crocker-Amazon neighborhoods, sometimes referred to as the "Outer Mission" (not to be confused with the actual Outer Mission neighborhood). The Mission District is part of San Francisco's supervisorial districts 6, 9 and 10.

The Mission is often warmer and sunnier than other parts of San Francisco. The microclimates of San Francisco create a system by which each neighborhood can have different weather at any given time, although this phenomenon tends to be less pronounced during the winter months. The Mission's geographical location insulates it from the fog and wind from the west. This climatic phenomenon becomes apparent to visitors who walk downhill from 24th Street in the west from Noe Valley (where clouds from Twin Peaks in the west tend to accumulate on foggy days) towards Mission Street in the east, partly because Noe Valley is on higher ground whereas the Inner Mission is at a lower elevation.

The Mission includes four recognized sub-districts. The northeastern quadrant, adjacent to Potrero Hill is known as a center for high tech startup businesses including some chic bars and restaurants. The northwest quadrant along Dolores Street is famous for Victorian mansions and the popular Dolores Park at 18th Street. Two main commercial zones, known as the Valencia corridor (Valencia St, from about 15th to 22nd) and the 24th Street corridor known as Calle 24 in the south central part of the Mission District are both very popular destinations for their restaurants, bars, galleries and street life.

History

Native Peoples and Spanish Colonization
Prior to the arrival of Spanish missionaries, the area which now includes the Mission District was inhabited by the Ohlone people who populated much of the San Francisco bay area. The Yelamu Indians inhabited the region for over 2,000 years. Spanish missionaries arrived in the area during the late 18th century. They found these people living in two villages on Mission Creek. It was here that a Spanish priest named Father Francisco Palóu founded Mission San Francisco de Asis on June 29, 1776. The Mission was moved from the shore of Laguna Dolores to its current location in 1783. Franciscan friars are reported to have used Ohlone slave labor to complete the Mission in 1791. This period marked the beginning of the end of the Yelamu culture. The Indian population at Mission Dolores dropped from 400 to 50 between 1833 and 1841.

San Francisco's southern expansion 

Ranchos owned by Spanish-Mexican families such as the Valenciano, Guerrero, Dolores, Bernal, Noé and De Haro continued in the area, separated from the town of Yerba Buena, later renamed San Francisco (centered around Portsmouth Square) by a two-mile wooden plank road (later paved and renamed Mission Street).

The lands around the nearly abandoned mission church became a focal point of raffish attractions including bull and bear fighting, horse racing, baseball and dueling. A famous beer parlor resort known as The Willows was located along Mission Creek just south of 18th Street between Mission Street and San Carlos Street. From 1865 to 1891, a large conservatory and zoo known as Woodward's Gardens covered two city blocks bounded by Mission Street, Valencia Street, 13th Street, and 15th Street. In the decades after the Gold Rush, the town of San Francisco quickly expanded, and the Mission lands were developed and subdivided into housing plots for working-class immigrants, largely German, Irish, and Italian, and also for industrial uses.

As the city grew in the decades following the Gold Rush, the Mission District became home to the first professional baseball stadium in California, opened in 1868 and known as Recreation Grounds seating 17,000 people which was located at Folsom and 25th Streets; a portion of the grounds remain as present day Garfield Square. Also, in the 20th century, the Mission District was home to two other baseball stadiums, Recreation Park located at 14th and Valencia and Seals Stadium located at 16th and Bryant with both these stadiums being used by the baseball team named after the Mission District known as the Mission Reds and the San Francisco Seals.

Irish immigrants moved into the Mission in the late 19th century.  The Irish made their mark not only by working for the city government but by helping build the Catholic Schools in the Mission District.

Earthquake and population shifts

During California's early statehood period, in the 19th and 20th century, large numbers of Irish and German immigrant workers moved into the area. Around 1900, the Mission District was still one of San Francisco's least densely populated areas, with most of the inhabitants being white families from the working class and lower middle class who lived in single-family houses and two-family flats. Development and settlement intensified after the 1906 earthquake, as many displaced businesses and residents moved into the area, making Mission Street a major commercial thoroughfare.

In 1901, the city of San Francisco changed laws and forbid burials in the city, which helped form the nearby city of Colma. During the 1906 San Francisco earthquake, a single working water hydrant (the so-called 'golden hydrant') saved the Mission District from being burned down due to by massive fires sparked by the earthquake. In the 1910s, the roads into Colma were not well maintained and it was a common practice to use the street cars to move bodies. Valencia Street became a location of many mortuaries and funeral homes during this time due to the quick access to Colma by street car.

In 1926, the Polish community of San Francisco converted a church on 22nd Street and Shotwell Street and opened its doors as the Polish Club of San Francisco; it is referred to today as the "Dom Polski", or Polish Home. The Irish American community made its mark on the area during this time, with notable residents such as etymologist Peter Tamony calling the Mission home.

During the 1940 to 1960s, a large number of Mexican immigrants moved into the area—displaced from an earlier "Mexican Barrio" located on Rincon Hill in order to create the western landing of the Bay Bridge—initiating white flight, giving the Mission a heavily Chicano/Latino character for which it continues to be known today. Starting in the 1960s, Central American immigration has contributed to a Central American presence that outnumbers Mexicans since the 1960s.

1970s–1990s

In the 1960s and 1970s, the Chicano/Latino population in the western part of the Mission (including the Valencia Corridor) declined somewhat and more middle-class young people moved in, including gay and lesbian people (alongside the existing LGBTQ Latino population). From the mid-1970s through the 1980s, the Valencia Street corridor included one of the most concentrated and visible lesbian neighborhoods in the United States. The Women's Building, Osento Bathhouse, Old Wives Tales bookstore, Artemis Cafe, Amelia's and The Lexington Club were part of that community.

In the late 1970s and early 1980s the Valencia Street corridor had a lively punk nightlife featuring the bands The Offs, The Avengers, the Dead Kennedys, Flipper, and several clubs including The Offensive, The Deaf Club, Valencia Tool & Die and The Farm. The former fire station on 16th Street, called the Compound, sported what was commonly referred to as "the punk mall", an establishment that catered to punk style and culture. On South Van Ness, Target Video and Damage magazine were located in a three-story warehouse. The former Hamms brewery was converted to a punk living/rehearsal building, popularly known as The Vats. The neighborhood was dubbed "the New Bohemia" by the San Francisco Chronicle in 1995.

In the 1980s and 1990s, the neighborhood received a higher influx of immigrants and refugees from Central America, South America, the Middle East and even the Philippines and former Yugoslavia, fleeing civil wars and political instability at the time. These immigrants brought in many Central American banks and companies which would set up branches, offices, and regional headquarters on Mission Street.

1990s–present 
From the late 1990s through the 2010s, and especially during the dot-com boom, young urban professionals moved into the area. It is widely believed that their movement initiated gentrification, raising rent and housing prices. A number of Latino American middle-class families as well as artists moved to the Outer Mission area, or out of the city entirely to the suburbs of East Bay and South Bay area. Despite rising rent and housing prices, many Mexican and Central American immigrants continue to reside in the Mission, although the neighborhood's high rents and home prices have led to the Latino population dropping by 20% over the decade until 2011. However, in 2008 the Mission still had a reputation of being artist-friendly.

In 2000, the Mission District's Latino population was at 60 percent.  By 2015 it had dropped to 48%; a city-funded research study that year predicted a decline to 31 percent by 2025.  However, the Mission remains the cultural nexus and epicenter of San Francisco's Mexican/Chicano, and to a lesser extent, the Bay Area's Nicaraguan, Salvadoran and Guatemalan community. While Mexican, Salvadoran, and other Latin American businesses are pervasive throughout the neighborhood, residences are not evenly distributed. Of the neighborhood's Chicano/Latino residents, most live on the eastern and southern sides. The western and northern sides of the neighborhood are more affluent and white. As of 2017, the northern part of the Mission, together with the nearby Tenderloin, is home to a Mayan-speaking community, consisting of immigrants who have been arriving since the 1990s from Mexico's Yucatán region. Their presence is reflected in the Mayan-language name of In Chan Kaajal Park, opened in 2017 north of 17th Street between Folsom and Shotwell Street.

Landmarks and features

Mission Dolores, the eponymous former mission located the far western border of the neighborhood on Dolores Street, continues to operate as a museum and as a California Historical Landmark, while the newer basilica built and opened next to it in 1918 continues to have an active congregation.

Dolores Park (Mission Dolores Park) is the largest park in the neighborhood, and one of the most popular parks in the city. Dolores Park is near Mission Dolores. Across from Dolores Park is Mission High School, built in 1927 in the Mediterranean Revival style.

The San Francisco Armory is a castle-like building located at 14th and Mission that was built as an armory for the U.S. Army and California National Guard. It served as the Headquarters of the 250th Coast Artillery from 1923 through 1944, and the 49th Infantry, also known as the 49ers, in the Cold War. From 2006 to 2018, it was the headquarters of BDSM porn production company Kink.com.

Food
The Mission district is also famous and influential for its restaurants. Dozens of taquerías are located throughout the neighborhood, showcasing a localized styling of Mexican food. San Francisco is the original home of the Mission burrito. There is also a high concentration of Salvadoran, Guatemalan, and Nicaraguan restaurants there as well as a large number of street food vendors. In the last couple decades a number of Mission restaurants have gained national attention, most notably the five restaurants who have received Michelin stars for 2017: Commonwealth, Lazy Bear, Aster, Californios, and Al's Place. A large number of other restaurants are also popular, including: Mission Chinese Food, Western Donut, Bar Tartine, La Taqueria, Papalote, Foreign Cinema on Mission Street, and Delfina on 18th.

Art scene

Numerous Latino artistic and cultural institutions are based in the Mission. These organizations were founded during the social and cultural renaissance of the late 1960s and early 1970s. Latino community artists and activists of the time organized to create community-based arts organizations that were reflective of the Latino aesthetic and cultural traditions. The Mission Cultural Center for Latino Arts, established by Latino artists and activists, is an art space that was founded in 1976 in a space that was formerly a furniture store. The local bilingual newspaper El Tecolote was founded in 1970. The Mission's Galería de la Raza, founded by local artists active in el Movimiento (the Chicano civil rights movement), is a nationally recognized arts organization, also founded during this time of cultural and social renaissance in the Mission, in 1971. Late May, the city's annual Carnaval festival and parade marches down Mission Street. Inspired by the festival in Rio de Janeiro, it is held in late May instead of the traditional late February to take advantage of better weather. The first Carnaval in San Francisco happened in 1978, with less than 100 people dancing in a parade that went around Precita Park. Alejandro Murguía (born 1949) is an American poet, short story writer, editor and filmmaker who was named San Francisco Poet Laureate in 2012. He is known for his writings about the Mission District where he has been a long-time resident.

Due to the existing cultural attractions, formerly less expensive housing and commercial space, and the high density of restaurants and drinking establishments, the Mission is a magnet for young people. An independent arts community also arose and, since the 1990s, the area has been home to the Mission School art movement. Many studios, galleries, performance spaces, and public art projects are located in the Mission, including 1890 Bryant St Studios, Southern Exposure, Art Explosion Studios, City Art Collective Gallery, Artists' Television Access, Savernack Street, and the oldest, alternative, not-for-profit art space in the city of San Francisco, Intersection for the Arts. There are more than 500 Mission artists listed on Mission Artists United site put together by Mission artists. The Roxie Theater, the oldest continuously operating movie theater in San Francisco, is host to repertory and independent films as well as local film festivals. Poets, musicians, emcees, and other artists sometimes gather on the southwest corner of the 16th and Mission intersection to perform. Dance Mission Theater is a nonprofit performance venue and dance school in the neighborhood as well.

Murals 
Throughout the Mission walls and fences are decorated with murals initiated by the Chicano Art Mural Movement of the 1970s and inspired by the traditional Mexican paintings. Some of the more significant mural installations are located on Balmy Alley and Clarion Alley. Many of these murals have been painted or supported by the Precita Eyes muralist organization.

Music scene 

The Mission is rich in musical groups and performances. Mariachi bands play in restaurants throughout the district, especially in the restaurants congregated around Valencia and Mission in the northeast portion of the district. Carlos Santana spent his teenage years in the Mission, graduating from Mission High School in 1965. He often returned to the neighborhood, including for a live concert with his band Santana that was recorded in 1969, and for the KQED documentary "The Mission" filmed in 1994.

The locally inspired song "Mission in the Rain" by Robert Hunter and Jerry Garcia appeared on Garcia's solo album Reflections, and was played by the Grateful Dead five times in concert in 1976.

Classical music is heard in the concert hall of the Community Music Center on Capp Street.

Elbo Room, a bar/live music venue on Valencia Street, is home to Afrolicious, and Dub Mission, a formerly weekly reggae/dub party started in 1996 by DJ Sep and over the years has brought many reggae and dub musicians to perform there.

The Mission District also has a Hip-Hop/Rap music scene. Record labels like Black N Brown/Thizz Latin, and Latin Ghetto Ent. help put Mission District rappers, like Goldtoes, Mousie, Gangsta Flea, The Goodfelonz, Mr. Kee, 10sion, and Don Louis & Colicious, get exposure through various compilations such as 17 Reasons, 18 Wit A Bullet, Organized Crime, Filthy Livin' In The Mission, The Daily Grind's Fillmoe 2 Da Mission, and many others. There is a new generation of young and upcoming rappers who are emerging from this neighborhood such as G-One (R.I.P.), Los Da Rockstar, Gabz La Nueva Melodia, DJ Blaze, Loco C, Young Mix, Yung Dunn, Monk, and up-and-coming artist Skuchi to name a few. Other prominent musicians and musical personalities include alternative rock bands and musicians Luscious Jackson, Faith No More, The Looters, Primus, Chuck Prophet & The Mission Express, Beck, Jawbreaker, and El Metate. Salsa music performers Los Mocosos and Cesar Ascarrunz.

Visual artists 
Some well-known artists associated with the Mission District include:

Arts organizations

Festivals, parades and fairs

Media 
The Mission District is covered by three free bilingual newspapers. El Tecolote is biweekly and has online articles. Mission Local is predominantly an online news site but does publish a semiannual printed paper. And El Reportero is a weekly newspaper that also has an online site.

Transit 
The neighborhood is served by the BART rail system with stations on Mission Street at 16th Street and 24th Street, by Muni bus numbers 9, 9R, 12, 14, 14R, 22, 27, 33, 48, 49, 67, and along the western edge by the J Church Muni Metro line, which runs down Church Street and San Jose Avenue.

Gentrification 
The Mission District in the San Francisco Bay Area is a historic transit hub for the Chicano and the Latino community, especially on the 16th Street BART Plaza. An atmosphere like a public market with live music and food trucks, it is also a commuting point for public transportation, which primarily serves low-income working-class people. The majority of the residents that live in Mission District are of minorities and low-income families and uses this useful and open hub for gatherings and doing local businesses like food trucks. However, because of the Dot-Com Boom that occurred in the 1990s and the rise of technology and social media, major technology companies like Google and Facebook have moved up their offices to places like Silicon Valley, south of the bay, that have now become the hot spot for tech companies. The Mission has felt the downstream effects of this demographic shift acutely. The intense surge in demand for housing and low supply of available housing has placed upward pressure on rents in transit hubs like the Mission, leading to gentrification and the displacement of families and small businesses. However, many residents protested and engaged in activism. They created a group called the "Plaza 16 Coalition" in response to the gentrification and the new zoning law, the "Eastern Neighborhoods Plan". They advocate for affordable housing, opposing market-rate developments and the luxury developments.

Education

San Francisco Unified School District operates public schools. Schools in the Mission District include:
 John O'Connell High School
 Buena Vista Horace Mann K-8 Community School
 Bryant Elementary School
 César Chávez Elementary School
 Leonard R. Flynn Elementary School
 Marshall Elementary School
 George R. Moscone Elementary School -  it had 350 students.
 Zaida T. Rodriguez Early Education School
 Hilltop Special Service Center (special school for grades 7–12)

The Roman Catholic Archdiocese of San Francisco operates the St. Peter's Catholic School, which opened in 1878. Previously its students were Irish or Italian American, but by 2014 95% of the student body was Latino and about two thirds were categorized as economically disadvantaged. Enrollment was once around 600 but by 2014 was around 300 due to gentrification. Its yearly per-student cost was $5,800 while yearly tuition, the lowest in the archdiocese, was $3,800.

See also

 826 Valencia
 Intersection for the Arts
 The Lexington Club
 Tartine – local bakery
 The Redstone Building

Further reading
Hooper, Bernadette (2006). San Francisco's Mission District. Arcadia Publishing. .
 Mirabal, Nancy Raquel, "Geographies of Displacement: Latinas/os, Oral History, and the Politics of Gentrification in San Francisco's Mission District," Public Historian, 31 (May 2009), 7–31.
 Heins, Marjorie "Strictly Ghetto Property: The Story of Los Siete de La Raza" Ramparts Press; first edition (1972)

References

External links

 The Mission – Neighborhoods: The Hidden Cities of San Francisco (KQED, 1994)
 Mission Dolores Neighborhood Association
 North Mission Neighborhood Association
 San Francisco Chronicle, November 26, 1995: 'Neo-Hipsters Keep the Beat in the Mission'
 New York Times, September 14, 2008: '36 Hours in San Francisco's Mission District'
 New York Times, November 20, 2005: 'San Francisco's Mission District: Eclectic, Eccentric, Electric'
 New York Times, November 5, 2000: "Mission District Fights Dot-Com Fever'
 New York Times, January 16, 1999: 'In Old Mission District: Changing Grit to Gold'
 What Its Like To Get Kicked Out of Your Neighborhood

 
Chicano and Mexican neighborhoods in California
Neighborhoods in San Francisco
Hipster neighborhoods